The 2009–10 season was Galatasarays 106th in existence and the 52nd consecutive season in the Süper Lig. This article shows statistics of the club's players in the season, and also lists all matches that the club have played in the season.

Club

The Board of Directors

Technical Staff

Medical Staff

Squad

Transfers

In

Out

Loan out

Squad statistics

Statistics accurate as of match played May 16, 2010

Pre-season and friendlies
All times at CET

Competitions

Süper Lig

League table

Results summary

Results by round

Matches
All times in EEST

Turkish Cup

Kick-off listed in local time (EEST)

Play-off round

Group stage

Quarter-finals

UEFA Europa League

All times at CET

Second qualifying round

Third qualifying round

Play-off round

Group stage

Knockout phase

Round of 32

Attendance

References

External links
 Galatasaray Sports Club Official Website 
 Turkish Football Federation - Galatasaray A.Ş. 
 uefa.com - Galatasaray AŞ

2009-10
Turkish football clubs 2009–10 season
2000s in Istanbul
2010 in Istanbul
Galatasaray Sports Club 2009–10 season